Alexander Pschill (born 13 June 1970) is an Austrian actor who is best known for starring in Inspector Rex from 2002 to 2004.

Biography
From 1989 to 1993, Alexander Pschill studied at the "Cornish College of the Arts Professional Acting Conservatory" in Seattle, Washington and graduated as Bachelor of Fine Arts. Besides playing the leading role in Peter Patzak's 1993 television production 1945, which started Pschill's career, the actor also starred in Der Sohn des Babymachers and Glück auf Raten (both 1995). From 2000 onwards, Pschill was a member of the cast of Julia – Eine ungewöhnliche Frau and from 2002 to 2004, he portrayed the main character Marc Hoffmann in Inspector Rex alongside Elke Winkens. He starred in the eighth, ninth and tenth season of the TV series (episodes 91 to 119).

Alexander Pschill's younger sister is singer Fawni.

Filmography

Music video appearances
 2011: Kreisky - "Scheisse, Schauspieler"

As director
2004: Seven New Plays --- animated short film directed by Markus Engel and Alexander Pschill

Stage

Awards
2001: Romy Shooting Star - Favorite New Actor

Notes
 — based on Daniel Glattauer's novel of the same title, published in 2006
 — based on Daniel Glattauer's novel of the same title, published in 2009, sequel to Gut gegen Nordwind

References

External links
 
 Alexander Pschill at Doris Fuhrmann Management
 Alexander Pschill at Theater in der Josefstadt
 
 Alexander Pschill at castingvideos

Living people
1970 births
Austrian male stage actors
Male actors from Vienna
Cornish College of the Arts alumni
Austrian male film actors
Austrian male television actors